Tinchlik (before 2012: Hamza) is a city in Fergana Region, Uzbekistan. It is part of Oltiariq District. Its population is 14,700 (2016).

References

Populated places in Fergana Region
Cities in Uzbekistan